The Northern Mallee Football League (NMFL) was an Australian rules football formed in 1979 from the merging of the now defunct Tyrrell Football League with another local Mallee League.  The competition that finished in 1996 with only five clubs based in the Mallee  region of Victoria, Australia and eventually merged with the Southern Mallee Football League to form the Mallee Football League (Victoria). The league featured three grades in the Australian rules football competition, being First-Grade, Reserve-Grade and Under 16s.

History

Clubs

(*) Ouyen Rovers and Tempy-Gorya-Patchewollock merged at the end of the 1996 season to form Ouyen United before starting in the Mallee Football League (Victoria) in 1997.

Premierships

Mallee (Victoria)
Defunct Australian rules football competitions in Victoria (Australia)